Pierre Kolp is a Belgian composer and music pedagogue born in Cologne, Germany, on 23 March 1969.

With composers Juan Carlos Tolosa, Francis Ubertelli, and David Nuñezañez, he founded the Black Jackets Company in 1995, an international society of contemporary arts based in Brussels.

Work
For many years, Kolp has taught music theory, organology, aesthetics, history, and composition. In 1997, he became director of the Institut de rythmique Jaques-Dalcroze de Belgique, an educational institute in Brussels. In 2004, he became president of the Francophone Association of Belgian Music Academies and delegate to the European Music Schools Union.
Kolp has written several articles on creativity, time, and musical spaces.

He gave composition master classes at the National University of Córdoba, Argentina, in 1999, and at the Pontifical Catholic University of Chile in 2002. He also works with conductor Juan Carlos Tolosa, composer André Ristic, and virtuoso Stephane Ginsburgh, all three of whom have also taught at the Institut de rythmique Jaques-Dalcroze de Belgique.

Catalogue of Works

Orchestra
 Cosmose (2006–2008), 40 minutes
 Ho, mia kor''' (2007), 8 minutes
 Los cometas colorados - opera (2002), 10 minutes
 Manimatrix (2002–2004), 25 minutes
 Stop Exchange (2008), 20 minutes

Stage
 Désirs chorégraphiques - music for dance (1994), 14 minutes
 Los cometas colorados - opera (2002), 10 minutes
 The Eyes of Ambush - stage music (2003), 8 minutes
 Perdre corps - music for dance (2005), 13 minutes

Chamber ensemble
 Chant contre champs - for 7 players (1994), 6 minutes
 Antipasti - for 7 players (1995), 12 minutes
 Mat - for 6 players (1996), 14 minutes
 Have a Break - for 6 players (1997), 18 minutes
 Passerelle - for 4 players and electronics (1999), 8 minutes
 Mani - for various combinaisons of players (2001–2002)
 Wet Wet Wet Wedding - for 3 players and tape (2004), 3–15 minutes

Chamber music
 Sept Blasons - for wind quintet (1994), 14 minutes
 Interchamps - for 2 flutes and guitar (1994), 14 minutes
 Speaker - for flute quartet (1995), 6 minutes
 I ching  - for flute and guitar (1996), 10 minutes
 Incipit vita nova - first piano trio (2001), 7 minutes
 So-mani dreams are explored - second piano trio (2005), 15 minutes
 The Bowling' Stones - for 2 pianos (2006), 9 minutes
 Plug-in - for 2 pianos (2007), 6 minutes

Solo instrument
 P as T - for alto (2005)
 Sub-Negation - for any solo instrument, 2 versions (2007–2008), 12 minutes
 Portiques génitifs - for cello (1994), 6 minutes
 Beaver Tuned - for piano (1998), 10 minutes
 Due scherzi - for piano (2007), 12 minutes
 So Slow the Snow - for piano (2006), 10 minutes

Vocal music
 Eggs - for choir (1994), 8 minutes
 Hors d'un coffret de Santal'' - 7 melodies for one singer and piano (1997), 12 minutes

References

External links

 Official website
 21st-century living composers website

1969 births
Living people
20th-century classical composers
21st-century classical composers
Belgian classical composers
Belgian male classical composers
Musicians from Brussels
Royal Conservatory of Liège alumni
20th-century Belgian male musicians
21st-century male musicians